Grayground (stylized as grayground.) is the debut studio album of South Korean singer and record producer Gray. It was released on August 17, 2021 through AOMG.

Singles 
"I Don't Love You" was pre-released on August 10, 2021. It charted at number 121 on the Gaon Digital Chart.

Music and lyrics 
Grayground encompasses trendy mainstream black music genres such as trap, funk, emo rap and dancehall with a strong touch of pop. It has songs with delicate instrumental composition such as "Rise", whose energetic rhythm creates a refreshing mood; "Ready to Love", which features rippling horn sounds; and "Eternal Sunshine", which features Jason Lee's sentimental saxophone performance in its postlude. The pre-release single "I Don't Love You" is a song about ending a relationship without regret. It has an "addictive melody" and "lyrics you can empathize with". The lead single "Party for the Night" is a cheerful party song with Lee Hi's catchy hook and Loco's smooth rap. It features modernized beats and melodies that drew inspiration from 90's hip-hop.

Critical reception 
Hwang Duha of Rhythmer rated Grayground 2.5 out of 5 stars. He pointed out that the various guest appearances on the album do not create synergy and steal the spotlight from Gray. Overall, he found Grayground to be a smoothly produced album that does not leave a strong impression.

Lim Seon-hui of IZM rated "I Don't Love You" 2.5 out of 5 stars. According to Lim, "I Don't Love You" does its job okay as a pre-release single, but the song itself lacks attractiveness because Gray's relaxed melodic rap performance on a melancholy guitar riff is bland.

Year-end lists

Track listing

Charts

Sales

References 

2021 debut albums
AOMG albums
Dancehall albums
Emo rap albums
Funk albums by South Korean artists
Korean-language albums
Trap music albums